Peeter Laurson (born 4 February 1971 in Tartu) is an Estonian chemist, economist and politician. He was a member of XII Riigikogu.

He has been a member of party Isamaa.

References

Living people
1971 births
Isamaa politicians
Estonian chemists
21st-century Estonian economists
University of Tartu alumni
People from Tartu
Politicians from Tartu
Members of the Riigikogu, 2011–2015